Rhizopsammia wellingtoni, or Wellington's solitary coral, is an endemic species of coral from the Galápagos Islands in Ecuador, recorded between  underwater. Before 1982, this species was considered abundant at some sites, but the El Niño event of 1982 and 1983 destroyed most colonies of this species, except for two populations. But since 2000, scientists have not found any even at those two sites, indicating that the species is particularly sensitive to changes in the temperature of water in which they live.

This coral species is among the 25 "most wanted lost" species that are the focus of Global Wildlife Conservation's "Search for Lost Species" initiative.

References 

Endemic fauna of the Galápagos Islands
Endangered species
Critically endangered biota of South America
Animals described in 1982
Dendrophylliidae